Katja Požun (born 7 April 1993) is a Slovenian former ski jumper.

Požun made her World Cup debut on 3 December 2011 in Lillehammer, Norway. She reached the World Cup individual podium twice. At the 2014 Winter Olympics, she placed eleventh in the normal hill event. At the FIS Nordic World Ski Championships 2013 in Val di Fiemme, she finished 18th in the normal hill event. She also has four medals from the Junior World Championships, including gold in the women's team normal hill event from 2013.

World Cup

Standings

References

1993 births
Living people
People from Trbovlje
Slovenian female ski jumpers
Olympic ski jumpers of Slovenia
Ski jumpers at the 2014 Winter Olympics
Universiade medalists in ski jumping
Universiade gold medalists for Slovenia
Universiade bronze medalists for Slovenia
Competitors at the 2013 Winter Universiade
21st-century Slovenian women